Yellow Rose is a 2019 American-Filipino musical drama film co-written and directed by Diane Paragas. It is produced by Cecilia R. Mejia, Diane Paragas, Rey Cuerdo, Orian Williams, and Jeremiah Abraham. The film stars Eva Noblezada, Dale Watson, Princess Punzalan, and Lea Salonga. The plot follows Rose, a Filipina undocumented immigrant, who dreams of leaving her small town in Texas to pursue her country music dreams. Her plan is put on hold when her mother is taken by Immigration and Customs Enforcement and Rose is forced to flee to Austin, Texas.

The film premiered at the Los Angeles Asian Pacific Film Festival on May 2, 2019 and received positive reviews. Stage 6 Films acquired the film and released it on October 9, 2020.

Cast 

 Eva Noblezada as Rose Garcia
 Lea Salonga as Gail Garcia
 Dale Watson as himself
 Princess Punzalan as Priscilla Garcia
 Gustavo Gomez as Jose
 Libby Villari as Jolene
 Liam Booth as Elliot Blatnik

Production 
In May 2019, it was announced that the film would premiere at the Los Angeles Asian Pacific Film Festival (LAAPFF) on May 2, 2019. Director and screenplay writer Diane Paragas told reporters that the film has been in the works since 2004. It was also announced that Paragas would sing on the soundtrack as well as Eva Noblezada, Lea Salonga, and Dale Watson.

Principal photography began in Austin, Texas and Manila, Philippines on August 17, 2018. Filming wrapped in January 2019.

Soundtrack 
The soundtrack of the film was released by Sony Music Masterworks on October 9, 2020.

Release 
Yellow Rose premiered at the LAAPFF on May 2, 2019. It was screened at several other film festivals internationally. It won thirteen film festival awards, particularly praising Paragas' directing and Noblezada and Salonga's performances. Though the film's theatrical release was delayed due to the COVID-19 pandemic, it was released on October 9, 2020. The film is one of the first Filipino-American films to be released by a major Hollywood studio for theatrical release.

Reception

Box office 
Yellow Rose opened in 9th place at the US box office, taking in $150,000 in 900 theaters over its opening weekend.

Critical reception 
The site's critical consensus reads, "A coming-of-age story with a timely twist, Yellow Rose offers a fresh -- and sweetly rewarding -- perspective on the immigrant experience." On Metacritic, the film has a weighted average score of 71 out of 100, based on 13 critics, indicating "generally favorable reviews".

A film critic for Minorities Report Film wrote "Yellow Rose is a much needed film that reminds everyone that we are surrounded by people that might be living in sorrow and pain" 

New York Times said Paragas "spins a story that is both politically timely and personal...the music has the greatest staying power..."

Accolades

References

External links
 Official site
 

2019 films
2019 drama films
2010s musical drama films
2010s teen drama films
American musical drama films
American teen drama films
Country music films
Films about Filipino Americans
Films about Filipino families
Films about illegal immigration to the United States
Films postponed due to the COVID-19 pandemic
Films set in Austin, Texas
Films shot in Austin, Texas
Films set in Texas
Films shot in Manila
Stage 6 Films films
American independent films
2019 independent films
2010s American films